In ancient Roman religion, Spes (pronounced ) was the goddess of hope. Multiple temples to Spes are known, and inscriptions indicate that she received private devotion as well as state cult.

Republican Hope

During the Republic, a temple to "ancient Hope" (Spes vetus) was supposed to have been located near the Praenestine Gate. It was associated with events that occurred in the 5th century BC, but its existence as anything except perhaps a private shrine has been doubted.

A well-documented temple of Spes was built by Aulus Atilius Calatinus along with Fides, as the result of vows (vota) made to these goddesses during the First Punic War.

At Capua in 110 BC, a temple was built to the triad of Spes, Fides, and Fortuna.

Imperial Hope
Spes was one of the divine personifications in the Imperial cult of the Virtues. Spes Augusta was Hope associated with the capacity of the emperor as Augustus to ensure blessed conditions.

Like Salus ("Salvation, Security"), Ops ("Abundance, Prosperity"), and Victoria ("Victory"), Spes was a power that had to come from the gods, in contrast to divine powers that resided within the individual such as Mens ("Intelligence"), Virtus ("Virtue"), and Fides ("Faith, Fidelity, Trustworthiness").

Greek Elpis
The Greek counterpart of Spes was Elpis, who by contrast had no formal cult in Greece. The primary myth in which Elpis plays a role is the story of Pandora. The Greeks had ambivalent or even negative feelings about "hope", and the concept was unimportant in the philosophical systems of the Stoics and Epicureans.

See also
Hope (virtue)

References

Further reading

 Clark, Mark Edward. "Spes in the Early Imperial Cult: 'The Hope of Augustus'." Numen 30.1 (1983) 80–105.
 

Roman goddesses
Personifications in Roman mythology
Ancient Roman religion